Richard Turley may refer to:

 Richard E. Turley Jr. (born 1956), American historian and genealogist
 Richard Marggraf Turley (born 1970), British literary critic, poet and novelist
 Richard Turley (graphic designer), English creative director and graphic designer